François II de Beauharnais (died 1651) was a French magistrate.  He was seigneur of La Grillière, the first president to the Présidial of Orléans (1598), lieutenant général to the bailliage of Orléans, and a Third Estate député at the Estates General of 1614.

Family
He was the son of François I de Beauharnais, seigneur de Miramion, and his wife Madeleine Bourdineau.

Marriage and issue
He married Anne Brachet, (daughter of Antoine Brachet and his wife Jeanne Jamet).  They had 7 children, including :

 Jean de Beauharnais, seigneur de La Boische et de La Chaussée.

1651 deaths
French politicians
Beauharnais
Year of birth unknown